The following is the qualification system and list of qualified nations for the Equestrian at the 2023 Pan American Games competition.

Qualification system
A quota of 150 equestrian riders (44 dressage, 46 eventing and 60 show jumping) will be allowed to qualify. A maximum of 12 athletes can compete for a nation across all events (with a maximum of four per discipline). Athletes qualified through various qualifying events and rankings.

If a country does not qualify a team in equestrian, it may enter a maximum of two individuals per discipline. A team can be made up of three of four athletes, meaning if reallocation does occur, countries with individuals can qualify teams, respecting the maximum number of teams allowed to compete in each discipline.

Qualification summary
A total of 7 NOC's qualified athletes.

Qualification timeline

Dressage
A total of eight teams of 4 (or 3) athletes each will qualify, along with 12 individuals who will qualify for a total of 44 athletes.

Team

Individual

Eventing
A total of ten teams of 4 (or 3) athletes each will qualify, along with 6 individuals will qualify for a total of 46 athletes.

Team

Individual

Jumping
A total of 12 teams of 4 (or 3) athletes each will qualify, along with 12 individuals will qualify for a total of 60 athletes.

Team

Individual

References

P
Qualification for the 2023 Pan American Games